Wade Township is the name of two townships in the U.S. state of Illinois:

 Wade Township, Clinton County, Illinois
 Wade Township, Jasper County, Illinois

See also

Wade (disambiguation)

Illinois township disambiguation pages